No. 316 "City of Warsaw" Polish Fighter Squadron was a Polish fighter squadron formed in Great Britain as part of an agreement between the Polish Government in Exile and the United Kingdom in 1941. It was one of several Polish fighter squadrons fighting alongside the Royal Air Force during World War II.

History

No 316 Squadron was formed at Pembrey on 15 February 1941 as a Polish fighter unit equipped with Hawker Hurricane Mk.Is. It was engaged in defensive duties over south-west England until it re-equipped with Hurricanes Mk.IIs and began sweeps over northern France. It later re-equipped with the Spitfire and then Mustang aircraft.

Commanding officers

Squadron bases

Aircraft operated

References

Notes

Bibliography

 Halley, James J. The Squadrons of the Royal Air Force & Commonwealth 1918–1988. Tonbridge, Kent, UK: Air Britain (Historians) Ltd., 1988. .
 Jefford, C.G. RAF Squadrons, a Comprehensive Record of the Movement and Equipment of all RAF Squadrons and their Antecedents since 1912. Shrewsbury, Shropshire, UK: Airlife Publishing, 2001. .
 Rawlings, John D.R. Fighter Squadrons of the RAF and their Aircraft. London: Macdonald & Jane's (Publishers)Ltd., 1969 (revised edition 1976, reprinted 1978). .

External links

 Photo Gallery of 316 Squadron
 History of No.'s 300–318 Squadrons at RAF Web
 Personnel of the Polish Air Force in Great Britain 1940–1947

316
No. 316
316
Military units and formations established in 1941
Military units and formations disestablished in 1946
Poland–United Kingdom military relations